Darghak (also Romanized as Dorghak; also known as Darghak-e Pā’īn) is a village in Bahmayi-ye Sarhadi-ye Gharbi Rural District, Kohgiluyeh and Boyer-Ahmad Province, Iran which separated to two parts, Darghak-e Pā’īn and Darghak-e Bā’lā’, by a valley its name is Daray-e Dā’rghak . At the 2006 census, its population was 1,464, in 260 families. At the 2016 census, its population decreased to 1,222, and the families numbers raised to 292.
Gelim Mosh'teh, a kind of rug, is the handcraft which only can be found in this village.

References 

Populated places in Kohgiluyeh County